George Philpot or Philpott (died 1624) was an English landowner, courtier, and patron of musicians.

His home was at Thruxton, Hampshire. Philpot was a patron of the composer Thomas Weelkes. He donated a bell to the parish church of St Peter and Paul in 1600.

King James and Anne of Denmark stayed with the Philpots at Thruxton in August 1603. They were travelling from Farnham Castle to Wilton House, and went next to Sir Richard Gifford's house at King's Somborne. At Thruxton again on 28 August 1607, Anne of Denmark rewarded George Philpot's musicians with 20 shillings, and then visited Lady Mason.

George Philpot was Sheriff of Hampshire in 1621.

Marriage and family
He was twice married, his children included:
 John Philpot
 Thomas Philpot
 Catherine Philpot
 Anne Philpot, who married John Paynter
 Alice Philpot
 Mary Philpot, who married Mr Cheney
 Barbara Philpot, who married Mr Eccles
 Lucy Philpot, who married Lord Henry Paulet, a son of William Paulet, 4th Marquess of Winchester and Lucy Cecil.
 Frances Philpot, who married Thomas Caesar, a son of Julius Caesar (judge).

References

1624 deaths
Court of James VI and I